Bukoba Urban District is one of the eight districts of the Kagera Region of Tanzania.  It is bordered to east by Lake Victoria and to the west by Bukoba Rural District. Its administrative seat is the town of Bukoba.

According to the 2012 Tanzania National Census, the population of Bukoba Urban District was 128,796, from 80,868 in 2002, and 46,503 in 1988.

Transport

Road
Paved trunk road T4 from Mwanza to the Ugandan border passes through Bukoba Urban District.

Administrative subdivisions
As of 2022, Bukoba Urban District was administratively divided into 14 wards.

Wards

 Bakoba
 Bilele
 Buhemba
 Hamugembe
 Ijuganyondo
 Kagondo
 Kahororo
 Kashai
 Kibeta
 Kitendaguroward
 Miembeni
 Nshambya
 Nyanga
 Rwamishenye

References

Districts of Kagera Region